Pamela Marshall    is an archaeologist and historian specialising in the study of castles. Marshall was elected as a Fellow of the Society of Antiquaries of London in 2007. She worked at the University of Nottingham, teaching in the departments of archaeology and continuing education until her retirement. Marshall's research on castles has examined castles in England and France, as they had a shared castle culture, and is an authority on great towers. Between 2000 and 2014, Marshall was chair/secretary of the Castle Studies Group and is Comité Permanent of the Colloques Château Gaillard, a biannual conference for castellologists.

Education
Marshall completed a PhD at the University of Nottingham in 2006, titled Magna Turris: A study of the development, planning and use of social space in donjons of the eleventh and twelfth centuries located in the geographical territories of the Norman and Angevin kings of England.

Career
In the 1990s the field of castle studies underwent a historiographical change, placing greater emphasis on the role of castles as symbols and expressions of status, and what they meant to people in the Middle Ages. Marshall was one of several researchers to apply this approach to great towers (keeps), alongside Philip Dixon and Sandy Heslop. Dixon and Marshall studied Hedingham Castle's keep, proposing to a "radical re-assessment" of the building as a ceremonial rather than domestic space. A similar approach  at Norham Castle's keep by the duo revealed it had a complex building history.

Marshall co-directed excavations at Newark Castle, Nottinghamshire. The results were documented in the book Guardian of the Trent: the Story of Newark Castle, which won the an Alan Ball Local History Award in 1998. Marshall was chair/secretary of the Castle Studies Group between 2000 and 2014, and was succeeded by Gillian Scott. Between 2000 and 2014, and again since 2020 Marshall has been the representative for Great Britain on the Comité Permanent of the Colloques Château Gaillard.

Selected publications

Marshall has authored or co-authored six books and published articles in venues such as Château Gaillard: Etudes de castellologie médiévale, The Castle Studies Group Journal, The Archaeological Journal, and the Transactions of the Thoroton Society of Nottinghamshire.

Books

Articles and chapters

References

Marshall, Pamela
21st-century British archaeologists
Fellows of the Society of Antiquaries of London
Year of birth missing (living people)
Living people
21st-century British women writers
Alumni of the University of Nottingham
Castellologists
Academics of the University of Nottingham